The 10th Anti-Aircraft Division (10th AA Division) was an air defence formation of the British Army during the early years of the Second World War. It defended Yorkshire and Northern Lincolnshire during The Blitz and the Baedeker Blitz but only had a short career.

Mobilisation
The 10th Anti-Aircraft Division was one of five new divisions created on 1 November 1940 by Anti-Aircraft Command to control the expanding anti-aircraft (AA) defences of the United Kingdom. The  division was formed by taking the two southern brigade areas (31st and 39th) from the existing 7th AA Division in North East England, together with a newly formed brigade (62nd brigade), and giving it responsibility for the air defence of East and West Yorkshire and the Humber Estuary.

The divisional headquarters (HQ) was at York and the first General Officer Commanding (GOC), appointed on 14 November 1940, was Major-General Langley Browning, who had been Commander, Royal Artillery, at 4th Infantry Division. The 10th AA Division formed part of II AA Corps.

The Blitz

The division's fighting units, organised into three AA Brigades, consisted of Heavy Anti-Aircraft (HAA) and Light Anti-Aircraft (LAA) gun regiments and Searchlight (S/L) regiments of the Royal Artillery. The HAA guns were concentrated in the Gun Defence Areas (GDAs) at Hull, Leeds and Sheffield.

At the time the 10th AA Division was created, the industrial towns of the UK were under regular attack by night, to which the limited AA defences replied as best they could. West Yorkshire, despite its important industrial facilities, steelworks, aircraft and ordnance factories, was at a considerable distance from the Luftwaffes bases and was less often raided than coastal targets and The Midlands. Nevertheless, in the 10th AA Division's area, Sheffield was badly bombed on 12 and 15 December 1940 (the Sheffield Blitz), Leeds on 14 March 1941 (the Leeds Blitz), Hull on 18 March (the Hull Blitz) and on 7 and 8 May, when Sheffield was also hit again.

There were still too few AA guns for the tasks set them, and in March 1941 AA Command was obliged to shift some HAA guns from Sheffield to Liverpool, which was under much heavier attack. The position on LAA gun sites was worse: only small numbers of Bofors 40 mm guns were available at the start of the Blitz, and most LAA detachments had to make do with Light machine guns (LMGs).

Order of Battle 1940–41
The division's composition during the Blitz was as follows:

 31st (North Midland) AA Brigade – HQ York: responsible for West Yorkshire
 87th HAA Rgt – joined by May 1941
 38th LAA Rgt (part) – to the 2nd AA Division by May 1941
 71st LAA Rgt
 43rd (Duke of Wellington's) S/L Rgt
 49th (West Yorkshire Regiment) S/L Rgt
 54th (Durham Light Infantry) S/L Rgt
 39th AA Brigade – HQ RAF Digby: responsible for airfields and the Humber Estuary
 62nd (Northumbrian) HAA Rgt
 91st HAA Rgt
 39th LAA Rgt
 40th (Sherwood Foresters) S/L Rgt
 46th (Lincolnshire Regiment) S/L Rgt – to the 7th AA Division by May 1941
 84th S/L Rgt

 62nd AA Brigade – responsible for Leeds and Sheffield
 75th (Home Counties) (Cinque Ports) HAA Rgt
 96th HAA Rgt
 117th HAA Rgt – new regiment formed in December 1940
 59th LAA Rgt – new regiment formed in October 1940
 2nd AA 'Z' Regiment – new divisional unit equipped with Z Battery rocket launchers, formed in September 1940
 10th AA Divisional Signals, Royal Corps of Signals (RCS) – formed at York November 1940
 10th AA Divisional Royal Army Service Corps (RASC)
 914th Company – to the 9th AA Division May 1941
 926th and 930th Companies
 10th AA Divisional Company, Royal Army Medical Corps (RAMC)
 10th AA Divisional Workshop Company, Royal Army Ordnance Corps (RAOC)

Mid-War
Even when the main Blitz ended in May 1941, Hull was an easy target for inexperienced Luftwaffe crews and was frequently bombed and Parachute mines dropped in the Humber Estuary. A special S/L 'Dazzle Barrage' installed at Hull foiled at least one attack, in August 1941. The other gaps in AA defences were filled as more equipment and units became available. Searchlights, now assisted by Searchlight Control (SLC) radar, were reorganised, with a 'Killer Belt' surrounding the Hull GDA to cooperate closely with RAF Night fighters. The HAA and support units increasingly became 'Mixed', indicating that women of the Auxiliary Territorial Service (ATS) were fully integrated into them.

In the Spring of 1942 a new phase in the air campaign began with the so-called Baedeker Blitz mainly directed against undefended British cities. In the 10th AA Division's area, York was accurately hit on 28 April, Hull on 19 May and 31 July, and Grimsby on 29 May. The severity of the raid on Hull on 19 May was lessened when many bombs were aimed at a fire started by incendiary bombs landing on an AA site outside the city. Redeployment of resources became necessary to counter the Baedeker raids, mostly to southern England, but also the establishment of a GDA at York. A series of Luftwaffe 'hit and run' raids against towns on the South Coast also led to the withdrawal of many LAA guns. At the same time, experienced units were posted away to train for service overseas (sometimes being lent back to AA Command while awaiting embarkation). This led to a continual turnover of units, which accelerated with the preparations for the invasion of North Africa (Operation Torch) in late 1942.

The 65th AA Brigade HQ joined in June 1942 and several regiments were transferred to it from the 39th AA Brigade. The 62nd AA Brigade HQ left in August 1942 and took part in Operation Torch, landing in North Africa in December.

Order of Battle 1941–42
During this period the division was composed as follows (temporary attachments omitted):

 31st AA Brigade
 12th HAA Rgt – from War Office (WO) Reserve August 1942Order of Battle of the Field Force in the United Kingdom, Part 3: Royal Artillery (Non-Divisional Units), 25 March 1941, TNA file WO 212/5.
 87th HAA Rgt – left AA Command June 1941; later to Eighth ArmyJoslen, p. 484.
 128th HAA Rgt – from the 62nd AA Brigade August 1942 
 71st LAA Rgt – to the 65th AA Brigade June 1942 114th LAA Rgt – from the 4th AA Division June 1942
 30th (Surrey) S/L Rgt – from the 5th AA Division October 1941; to the 11th AA Division January 194230 S/L Rgt at RA 39–45.
 43rd S/L Rgt – as above
 49th S/L Rgt – as above
 54th S/L Rgt – as above
 39th AA Brigade 62nd HAA Rgt – to WO Control for Operation Torch February–March 1942Joslen, p. 465.
 91st HAA Rgt – left AA Command May 1942; later to Middle East Forces (MEF)
 113th HAA Rgt – from the 2nd AA Division March 1942; to the 65th AA Brigade May 1942113 HAA Rgt War Diary 1942, TNA file WO 166/7481.
 152nd (Mixed) HAA Rgt – from the 62nd AA Brigade August 1942
 29th LAA Rgt –  from the 4th AA Division February–March 1942; to the 65th AA Brigade May 194229 LAA Rgt at RA 39–45.
 39th LAA Rgt – to the 4th AA Division by July 1941
 78th LAA Rgt – new regiment formed June 1941; left AA Command and arrived in India by August 194278 LAA Rgt at RA 39-45.
 121st (Leicestershire Regiment) LAA Rgt – from the 62nd AA Brigade May 1942
 40th S/L Rgt – as above
 46th S/L Rgt – to the 3rd AA Division  by May 1942
 84th S/L Rgt – as above
 2nd AA 'Z' Rgt – to the 65th AA Brigade May 1942
 62nd AA Brigade''' – to WO Control for Operation Torch August 1942Order of Battle of the Field Force in the United Kingdom, Part 3: Royal Artillery (Non-Divisional Units), 22 November 1942, TNA file WO 212/8 and WO 33/1962.
 66th (Leeds Rifles) HAA Rgt – from Orkney and Shetland Defences (OSDEF) June 1941; left AA Command and arrived in India by May 1942Joslen, p. 520.
 75th HAA Rgt – to the 6th AA Division Summer 1941 96th HAA Rgt – left AA Command by May 1942, later to MEF 117th HAA Rgt – to the 4th AA Division by December 1941 128th HAA Rgt – new regiment formed August, joined by December 1941; to the 31st AA Brigade August 1942
 139th (Mixed) HAA Rgt – new regiment formed September 1941, joined January 1942; to the 65th AA Brigade August 1942 152nd (Mixed) HAA Rgt – new regiment formed March 1942, to the 39th AA Brigade August 1942 59th LAA Rgt – left AA Command and arrived in India by April 1942Joslen, p. 524.
 121st (Leicestershire Regiment) LAA Rgt – converted from 44th S/L Rgt January 1942Litchfield, p. 139. to the 39th AA Brigade May 1942 65th AA Brigade – from 5 AA Division June 1942 113th HAA Rgt – from the 39th AA Brigade May 1942; to mobile training August 1942 139th HAA Rgt – from the 62nd AA Brigade August 1942 151st (Mixed) HAA Rgt – from the 4th AA Division July 1942 29th LAA Rgt – from the 39th AA Brigade May 1942; to WO Control for Operation Torch June 1942
 71st LAA Rgt – from the 31st AA Brigade August 1942
 2nd AA 'Z' Rgt – from the 39th AA Brigade May 1942The increased sophistication of communications for Gun Operations Rooms (GORs) and RAF Sectors was reflected in the growth in support units, which attained the following organisation by May 1942:

 10th AA Division Mixed Signal Unit HQ, RCS
 HQ No 1 Company
 10th AA Division Mixed Signal Office Section
 31st AA Brigade Signal Office Mixed Sub-Section
 107th RAF Fighter Sector Sub-Section (RAF Church Fenton)
 311th AA GOR Mixed Signal Section (Leeds GDA)
 24th AA Line Maintenance Section
 HQ No 2 Company
 39th AA Brigade Signal Office Mixed Sub-Section
 114th RAF Fighter Sector Sub-Section (RAF Kirton-in-Lindsey)
 312th AA GOR Mixed Signal Section (Sheffield GDA)
 62nd AA Brigade Signal Office Mixed Sub-Section
 408th AA GOR Mixed Signal Section (Humber GDA)
 24th AA Sub-GOR Mixed Signal Sub-Section
 25th AA Sub-GOR Mixed Signal Sub-Section
 26th AA Sub-GOR Mixed Signal Sub-Section
 27th AA Sub-GOR Mixed Signal Sub-Section
 65th AA Brigade Signal Office Mixed Sub-Section
 25th AA Line Maintenance Section
 26th AA Line Maintenance Section
 HQ 10th AA Div RASC
 926th, 930th Companies
 5th AA Tractor Battery – joined June 1942 10th AA Div RAMC
 10th AA Div Workshop Company, RAOC
 10th AA Div Radio Maintenance Company, RAOC

The RAOC companies became part of the new Royal Electrical and Mechanical Engineers (REME) during 1942.

Disbandment
A reorganisation of AA Command in October 1942 saw the AA divisions disbanded and replaced by a smaller number of AA Groups more closely aligned with the groups of RAF Fighter Command. The 10th AA Division, which had been at Sand Hutton, outside York, but was by now at Leeds, merged with 2nd AA Division to form 5th AA Group based at Nottingham and cooperating with No. 12 Group RAF.

General Officers Commanding
The following officers commanded 10th AA Division:
 Major-General Langley Browning, from 14 November 1940 to 13 February 1942
 Major-General Erroll Tremlett, promoted 14 February 1942 from command of the 44th AA Brigade, until disbandment

Notes

References

 Basil Collier, History of the Second World War, United Kingdom Military Series: The Defence of the United Kingdom, London: HM Stationery Office, 1957.
 Gen Sir Martin Farndale, History of the Royal Regiment of Artillery: The Years of Defeat: Europe and North Africa, 1939–1941, Woolwich: Royal Artillery Institution, 1988/London: Brasseys, 1996, .
 J.B.M. Frederick, Lineage Book of British Land Forces 1660–1978, Vol II, Wakefield, Microform Academic, 1984, .
 
 Norman E.H. Litchfield, The Territorial Artillery 1908–1988 (Their Lineage, Uniforms and Badges), Nottingham: Sherwood Press, 1992, .
 Cliff Lord & Graham Watson, Royal Corps of Signals: Unit Histories of the Corps (1920–2001) and its Antecedents, Solihull: Helion, 2003, .
 Sir Frederick Pile's despatch: "The Anti-Aircraft Defence of the United Kingdom from 28th July, 1939, to 15th April, 1945" London Gazette 18 December 1947.
 Brig N.W. Routledge, History of the Royal Regiment of Artillery: Anti-Aircraft Artillery 1914–55'', London: Royal Artillery Institution/Brassey's, 1994, .

External sources
 Anti-Aircraft Command (1940) at British Military History
 Generals of World War II
 Royal Artillery 1939–1945

Military units and formations established in 1940
10
Military units and formations disestablished in 1942
Military units and formations in York